Highway 3 is a highway in Israel. It begins at Highway 4 on the outskirts of Ashkelon, running east-northeast, passing through Kiryat Malakhi and Latrun, and ending just short of Modi'in.

Plan for the future 

The Israeli Ministry of Transportation plans for Highway 3 to be a major route that will connect the South District to Jerusalem via Latrun Interchange and Highway 1. The National Roads Company of Israel is converting the road to a multi-lane divided highway. Despite this, the road will not become an expressway because it is the only means of entrance to many nearby communities.

Israel Railways is constructing flying junctions between Highway 3 and the rail tracks that cross it.

Path of Highway 3 from northeast to southwest 

The northeast part of Highway 3 begins at Beit Horon Junction near Modi'in. It intersects Highways 1 and 6 and then passes several kibbutzim and moshavim until Re'em Junction where it joins Highway 40, running concurrently for 4 km until Malakhi Junction in Kiryat Malakhi. The Latrun–Nahshon section (between the intersections with highways 1 and 44) is the first concrete highway in Israel.

After the roads split, Highway 3 continues in Kiryat Malakhi and past more kibbutzim and moshavim until Abba Hillel Silver Junction east of Ashkelon, which intersects with Highway 4.

In the past, Highway 3 reached Ramallah and Jericho and terminated at Allenby bridge across the Jordan river. After the Oslo Accords in 1993, the portion of the road that passes through Ramallah and Jericho was transferred to Palestinian control (as with Highway 60), and portions of the road that remained under Israeli control were renamed as local roads.

Junctions and Interchanges

Hazardous road

15 km of highway 3 had been declared as a red road by the Israeli police in 2015.

References

See also 
 List of highways in Israel

3
3